With the inclusion of curling into many FISU Universiades many countries have had to hold national championships to determine a representative.

International University Sports Federation (FISU)

Canada 
In Canada, University curling is played in a variety of levels. U Sports has sanctioned the University Curling Championships since 2008.  The winners of the event will represent Canada at the FISU Universiades (in odd years).

Canadian Interuniversity Sport

2006 Championships 
Although this event was not fully sanctioned by the CIS or CCA, the winners still went on to represent Canada at the 2007 Winter Universiade.
Men's champs were the Saskatchewan Huskies and the women were from the Calgary Dinos. The women's team went on to win Gold.

CIS/CCA Curling Championships

Ontario University Athletics 
The OUA offers curling championships in Men's and Women's divisions.

Algoma
Brock
Carleton
Guelph
Lakehead
Laurentian
Laurier
McMaster
Queen's
Ryerson
Toronto
Trent
UOIT
Waterloo
Western
Windsor

Canadian Collegiate Athletic Association 
 
The Canadian Collegiate Athletic Association (CCAA) began to hold national championships in 2012. Two of the CCAA's member conferences have a curling championship.

Alberta Colleges Athletic Conference 
Augustana Faculty University of Alberta
Concordia University College of Alberta
Grand Prairie Regional College
Lakeland College
MacEwan College
Northern Alberta Institute of Technology (NAIT)
Olds College
Portage College
Red Deer College

Ontario Colleges Athletic Association 
Algonquin College
Confederation College
Mohawk College
Niagara College
Seneca College
Sir Sanford Flemming College
Sir Sanford Flemming College (Lindsay)
St. Clair College

United States of America 
Curling in the US is governed by College Curling USA.

References

Curling
College curl